The Ghadames Museum is an archaeological museum located in Ghadames, Libya.

Data

With its multiple wings, the museum specializes in Berber history and area wildlife. It includes archaeological remains from Ghadames dating to the Roman period, when it was named Cydamus. There are some column bases of a Roman temple in a section of the Museum.

Columns of the Christian church of Cydamus still remain in the "Sīdī Badrī" Mosque (the oldest in Libya): one is expected to be moved inside the Ghadames Museum.

The museum is one of the most visited places in the city by the tourists.

See also 

 Cydamus
 Capitoline Temple
 List of museums in Libya
 Treasury of Cyrene

References

Bibliography

 
 Lafi (Nora) "Ghadamès cité-oasis entre empire ottoman et colonisation"" in Federico Cresti (ed.), La Libia tra Mediterraneo e mondo islamico, Giuffrè, pp. 55–70, 2006

Archaeological museums in Libya
Berber culture
Ghadames
Ethnic museums
Museums with year of establishment missing
Berber architecture